The 2022 Outback Bowl was a college football bowl game played on January 1, 2022, with kickoff at 12:00 p.m. EST and televised on ESPN2. It was the 36th edition of the Outback Bowl, and was one of the 2021–22 bowl games concluding the 2021 FBS football season. Outback Steakhouse was the game's title sponsor. The game featured the Arkansas Razorbacks of the SEC and the Penn State Nittany Lions of the Big Ten. Arkansas pulled away in the second half, scoring 17 unanswered points in the 3rd quarter, to win the game, 24-10. Arkansas Razorback QB K.J. Jefferson was named the game's MVP. Penn State fell to 7-6 for the season, while Arkansas improved to 9-4.

Teams
Consistent with conference tie-ins, the game was played between teams from the Southeastern Conference (SEC) and Big Ten Conference. The bowl also has a tie-in with the Atlantic Coast Conference (ACC) if the ACC's opponent in the Orange Bowl is a Big Ten team, in which case an ACC team is selected for the Outback Bowl.

This was the first time that Arkansas and Penn State had ever played each other.

Arkansas Razorbacks

Penn State Nittany Lions

Game summary

Game MVP - Arkansas QB K.J. Jefferson, 14 of 19 - 98 yards - 1 INT, 20 carries 110 yards 1 TD.

Statistics
Team statistics
Individual statistics

References

External links
 Game statistics at statbroadcast.com

Outback Bowl
ReliaQuest Bowl
Arkansas Razorbacks football bowl games
Penn State Nittany Lions football bowl games
Outback Bowl
Outback Bowl